The 1998 British Formula Three season was the 48th British Formula Three Championship season. It commenced on 22 March, and ended on 4 October after sixteen races. Mario Haberfeld was the champion, while Phillip Scifleet won the Class B championship. The season was one of two halves as Enrique Bernoldi dominated the first half of the season and compatriot Haberfeld the second; ultimately the latter would prevail thanks in part to his stronger consistency.

Drivers and teams
The following teams and drivers were competitors in the 1999 season. Class B is for older Formula Three cars.

 Points System: 20-15-12-10-8-6-4-3-2-1 for first 10 finishers, with 1 point awarded for fastest lap.

References

AUTOCOURSE 1998-99https://web.archive.org/web/20051112051106/http://www.motorsport.com/news/series.asp?S=BF3&Y=1998

British Formula Three Championship seasons
Formula Three season
British Formula 3